Big Time is the only album by Ultra, an American hip hop group composed of Kool Keith and Tim Dog, who had previously collaborated as part of Ultramagnetic MCs. The duo only released one album, which contained many disses towards other rappers. It has been called "the holy Grail of the Kool Keith catalog, owing mostly to its rarity".

Track listing 

Sample credits
"NYC Street Corner Battle" contains samples from "You're Getting a Little Too Smart" by Detroit Emeralds (1973)
"Big Time" contains samples from "The Breakdown (Part II)" by Rufus Thomas (1971)
"Get Off the Dick" contains samples from "Kitty With the Bent Frame" by Quincy Jones (1971)
"Industry is Wak" contains samples from "The Sick Rose" by David Axelrod (1969) and "Why Can't People Be Colors Too?" by The Whatnauts (1972)
"No Face" contains samples from "The Mixed Up Cup" by Clyde McPhatter (1970)

Personnel
Timothy Blair – writer, performer, executive producer, A&R
Keith Matthew Thornton – writer, performer, producer (track 14), A&R
Eddie Pugh – executive producer
Kurt Matlin – producer (tracks: 1–3, 5–8, 10–13, 15–18)
Rex Colonel Doby Jr. – producer (tracks: 4, 9)
Paul Laster – performer (track 13)
Tom Baker – mastering
Junior – recording & mixing
Jim Rasfeld – layout
Scott Zuschin – photography

References

External links

Tim Dog albums
1996 debut albums
Kool Keith albums